Geraldine McCaughrean (born 6 June 1951) is a British children's novelist. She has written more than 170 books, including Peter Pan in Scarlet (2004), the official sequel to Peter Pan commissioned by Great Ormond Street Hospital,  the holder of Peter Pan's copyright. Her work has been translated into 44 languages worldwide. She has received the Carnegie Medal twice and the Michael L. Printz Award among others.

Career

McCaughrean was born in London and grew up in North London. She was the youngest of three children. She studied teaching but found her true vocation in writing. She claims that what makes her love writing is the desire to escape from an unsatisfactory world. Her motto is: do not write about what you know, write about what you want to know.

Her work includes many retellings of classic stories for children: The Odyssey, El Cid, The Canterbury Tales, The Pilgrim's Progress, Moby Dick, One Thousand and One Arabian Nights and Gilgamesh.

J. M. Barrie gave all rights to Peter Pan to Great Ormond Street Hospital in 1929, and in 2004, to coincide with Peter Pan'''s centenary, the hospital launched a competition to find the author of a sequel. McCaughrean won the competition, after submitting a synopsis and a sample chapter. Peter Pan in Scarlet was released internationally on 5 October 2006, published in the UK by Oxford University Press and in the US by Simon & Schuster.

McCaughrean has written many other children's fiction books including The Kite Rider, The Stones Are Hatching, and Plundering Paradise. She has also written six historical novels for adults including: The Maypole (1990), Fire's Astonishment (1991), Lovesong (1996) and The Ideal Wife (1997).

As of 2013, she has launched an online novel based on the Hylas and Hercules myth, A Thousand Kinds of Ugly.

Awards

For her lifetime contribution as a children's writer McCaughrean was the British nominee in 2004 for the biennial, international Hans Christian Andersen Award, the highest international recognition available to creators of children's books. She was elected an Honorary Fellow of Canterbury Christ Church University in 2006 and a Fellow of the English Association in 2010. She is a Fellow of the Royal Society of Literature since 2010.

McCaughrean has won several annual book awards. For A Pack of Lies, a collection of historical stories in a frame narrative, she won the two most prestigious British children's book awards. The Carnegie Medal, conferred by the Library Association (now CILIP), recognises the year's best children's or young adult's book. The Guardian Prize is a once-in-a-lifetime award judged by a panel of British children's writers and limited to fiction books.
 1987 Whitbread Children's Book Award for A Little Lower Than the Angels 1988 Carnegie Medal for A Pack of Lies 1989 Guardian Children's Fiction Prize for A Pack of Lies 1994 Whitbread Children's Book Award for Gold Dust 2000 Blue Peter Book of the Year, the inaugural Blue Peter Book Award, for The Pilgrim's Progress retold
 2001 Blue Peter "Best Book to Keep Forever" for The Kite Rider 2004 Whitbread Children's Book Award for Not the End of the World 2008 Michael L. Printz Award, from US librarians for the year's best in young-adult literature, The White Darkness 2018 Carnegie Medal for Where the World Ends 2018 Independent Bookshop Week Book Award for Where the World Ends Stop the Train (Oxford, 2001) was "Highly Commended" for the Carnegie Medal. From 1988 to 2018, McCaughrean has eight times made the Carnegie shortlist and is one of only eight authors to have won it twice since its creation in 1936.

Selected bibliographyA Little Lower Than the Angels (1987)A Pack of Lies (1988) lGold Dust (1993)Plundering Paradise (1996) (US title: The Pirate's Son)Forever X (1997)The Stones Are Hatching (1999)The Great Chase (2000)Stop the Train! (2001)The Kite Rider (2001)Showstopper! (2003)Smile! (2004)Not the End of the World (2004)The White Darkness (2005)Cyrano (2006)Peter Pan in Scarlet (2006)Tamburlaine's Elephants (2007)The Death-Defying Pepper Roux (2009)Pull Out All The Stops! (2010) (US title: The Glorious Adventures of the Sunshine Queen)The Positively Last Performance (2013)The Middle of Nowhere (2013)Where the World Ends (2017)The Supreme Lie (2021)

Notes

References

External links
 
 , review of Peter Pan in Scarlet by Mick Imlah, The Times Literary Supplement'', 25 October 2006
 
 
 Our Authors, 2 (including McCaughrean) at Romaunce Books, publisher of romantic and historical fiction
 

British children's writers
British fantasy writers
British historical novelists
British writers of young adult literature
Carnegie Medal in Literature winners
Costa Book Award winners
Guardian Children's Fiction Prize winners
Fellows of the Royal Society of Literature
Michael L. Printz Award winners
1951 births
Living people
Alumni of Canterbury Christ Church University
British women children's writers
Women science fiction and fantasy writers
Women historical novelists
Women writers of young adult literature
British women novelists
20th-century British novelists
20th-century British women writers
21st-century British novelists
21st-century British women writers
Writers from London
Fellows of the English Association